Özge Özel (born March 5, 1991) is a Turkish women's football forward currently playing in the Turkish Women's First Football League for Konak Belediyespor in Izmir with jersey number 35.

Playing career

Club

Özge Özel obtained her license on April 28, 2006, for Bucaspor, and began playing in the 2008–09 season of the Women's First League. After capping in 52 matches and scoring 29 goals in three seasons, she was transferred by Kdz. Ereğlispor in the second half of the 2011–12 season. She stood away from the pitch one season, and then moved to Second League-club Kızılcaköyspor in Aydın for the second half of the 2013–14 season, where she appeared in three games. With the beginning of the 2014–15 season's second half, Özel joined the İzmir-based Karşıyaka BESEM Spor, which was recently promoted to the First League. Her team was relegated at the end of the season, and she transferred to her hometown club Konak Belediyespor.  She played in three matches of the 2015–16 UEFA Women's Champions League qualifying round.

International
Özge Özel played for the Turley girls' national U-17 team in eleven matches between 2006 and 2007. Between 2006 and 2009, She was also a member of the Turley women's U-19 team, where she capped 22 times scoring one goal.

Career statistics
.

Honours
 Turkish Women's First League
 Bucaspor
 Runners-up (1): 2008–09

 Kdz. Ereğlispor
 Runners-up (1): 2011–12

 Konak Belediyespor
 Winners (1): 2015–16

References

External links

 Özge Özel at UEFA.com

Living people
1991 births
People from Konak
Footballers from İzmir
Turkish women's footballers
Women's association football forwards
Bucaspor women's players
Karadeniz Ereğlispor players
Karşıyaka BESEM Spor players
Konak Belediyespor players